Robert Blore and Son were a late 18th century/early 19th century firm of sculptors based at 125 Piccadilly in central London.

Background
Robert Blore the elder appears to be born around 1760 and worked until 1820 (when he presumably died). Robert Blore the younger was either his son or nephew and died in 1838. The term "Blore and Son" is used from 1790 indicating the younger Robert is born around 1770. The elder went bankrupt in 1818 and either died or retired two years later.

In 1825 Blore was partly subject of the scandalous "Memoirs of Herself and Others" by Harriette Wilson of Mayfair published by Stockdale in London which rapidly ran to 30 editions and made Mrs Wilson at least £10,000. Blore, by then married, successfully sued the publisher for £300 in libel damages.

Robert Blore the younger went into partnership with George Wilcox from 1830.

Family

In Chelsea in 1795 Blore the younger married Emma Earley. They were parents to Henry Blore (1803-1860).

Most Notable Works
Monument to Edward Foley (1805) in Stoke Edith
Monument to Sir William Myers, 1st Baronet (1805), Barbados Cathedral
Monument to John Wasdale (1807), St.Paul's Cathedral
Monument to Bishop James Yorke (1808) in Forthampton
Monument to Elizabeth, Countess of Mexborough (1821) in Methley
Monument to Elizabeth, Countess of Mexborough (1821) in Westminster Abbey
Monument to Edward Wrench (1821), Chester Cathedral
Monument to Thomas Winstanley (1823) St Peter's-in-the-East, Oxford
Monument to Thomas Rennell (1824) in Winchester Cathedral
Monument to the Hon Henry Savile of Mexborough (1828) in Methley
Monument to Sir Montague Cholmeley, 1st Baronet (1833) in Stoke Rochford, Lincolnshire

References
 

British sculptors